All We Need Is Love is the fifth studio album by Swiss recording artist Stefanie Heinzmann. It was released by BMG Rights Management on March 22, 2019 in German-speaking Europe. It became Heinzmann's second album to top the Swiss Albums Chart following her debut album Masterplan (2008).

Track listing

Notes
 signifies a co-producer

Charts

Weekly charts

Year-end charts

Release history

References

External links 
 

2019 albums
Stefanie Heinzmann albums
BMG Rights Management albums